The member states of the African Union (AU) are divided into five geographic regions of the African Union. The African diaspora, which includes people of African descent  living outside of the African continent, such as the Americas, Australia, Asia, and Europe, has been officially recognized by the AU as its sixth region.

List (In alphabetical order)

North

South

East

West

Central

African diaspora

In the Constitutive Act of the African Union, under amended Article 3(q) of the Act (Objectives), the following is stated regarding the African diaspora: “invite and encourage the full participation of the African Diaspora as an important part of our continent, in building the African Union.” Additionally, the African Union provides definition for its concept of the African diaspora as the following: “The African Diaspora consists of peoples of African origin living outside the continent, irrespective of their citizenship and nationality and who are willing to contribute to the development of the continent and the building of the African Union.”

In 2016, the African Union denied membership to Haiti due to membership admission, as per Article 29.1 of the Constitutive Act of the African Union, being limited to any “African State.”

In the African Union Handbook (2021), persons who have been appointed to represent the African diaspora at the Assembly of the African Union have been granted the status of observer. More specifically, the African Union Handbook (2021) states:

In January 2008, the Executive Council suggested that the African diaspora be treated as Africa’s sixth region and its participation in the AU’s organs and activities be strengthened (EX.CL/Dec.406(XII)). The Assembly has recognised the diaspora as a substantive entity contributing to the economic and social development of the continent and has invited its representatives as observers to Assembly sessions (see Assembly/AU/Res.1(XVIII) of January 2012).

The African Union has also established regional institutions, such as the Western Hemisphere African Diaspora Network, and international institutions, such as the Economic, Social and Cultural Council, to facilitate African diaspora relations. Additionally, the African Union works together with AfricaRecruit, the Caribbean Community and Common Market, the Commonwealth Business Council, the International Organization for Migration, and the World Bank to facilitate African diaspora relations, regionally and internationally. Furthermore, individual countries (e.g., Ghana, Ethiopia, Nigeria, South Africa) in Africa have also undertaken national efforts to facilitate African diaspora relations, internationally.

See also
United Nations geoscheme for Africa
Regions of Africa

References

African Union
African Union